The second cabinet of Prime Minister Václav Klaus was in power from 4 July 1996 to 2 January 1998. It was a minority coalition government that consisted of ODS, KDU-ČSL and ODA. It was supported by ČSSD. Towards the end of 1997, cabinet resigned in connection with accusations of funding irregularities in the ODS.

Government ministers

References

Czech government cabinets
Civic Democratic Party (Czech Republic)
KDU-ČSL
Václav Klaus
Civic Democratic Alliance
Coalition governments of the Czech Republic
Cabinets established in 1996
Cabinets disestablished in 1998